In textual criticism of the New Testament, Caesarean text-type is the term proposed by certain scholars to denote a consistent pattern of variant readings that is claimed to be apparent in certain Koine Greek manuscripts of the four Gospels, but which is not found in any of the other commonly recognized New Testament text-types (Byzantine, Western and Alexandrian). In particular a common text-type has been proposed to be found: in the ninth/tenth century Codex Koridethi; in Codex Basilensis A. N. IV. 2 (a Greek manuscript of the Gospels used, sparingly, by Erasmus in his 1516 printed Koine New Testament); and in those Gospel quotations found in the third century works of Origen, which were written after he had settled in Caesarea. The early translations of the Gospels in Armenian and Georgian also appear to witness to many of the proposed characteristic Caesarean readings, as do the small group of minuscule manuscripts classed as Family 1 and Family 13.

Description 

A particularly distinctive common reading of the proposed text-type is in Matthew 27:16-17, where the bandit released by Pontius Pilate instead of Jesus is named as "Jesus Barabbas" rather than — with all other surviving witnesses — just "Barabbas". Origen notes particularly that the form "Jesus Barabbas" was common in manuscripts in Caesarea, whereas he had not found this reading in his previous residence in Alexandria. Otherwise the Caesarean readings have a mildly paraphrastic tendency that seems to place them between the more concise Alexandrian, and the more expansive Western text-types. None of the surviving Caesarean manuscripts is claimed to witness a pure type of text, as all appear to have been to some degree assimilated with readings from the Byzantine text-type.

Some writers have questioned the validity of this grouping, claiming that the classification is the result of poor research. Insofar as the Caesarean text-type does exist (in Matt, Luke and John is not well defined), then it does so only in the Gospels. The proposed Caesarean witnesses do not appear to have any common distinctive readings in the rest of the New Testament. Some of the Caesarean manuscripts have the so-called Jerusalem Colophon.

The Caesarean text-type was discovered and named by Burnett Hillman Streeter in 1924. According to some scholars, it is only a hypothetical text-type (Aland).

There are no pure Caesarean manuscripts. In many cases, it is difficult to decide the original reading of the group, for instance in Mark 1:16:
  — ƒ13 565.
  — ƒ1
  — 700.
  — 28.

Classification 

H. von Soden — Iota (Jerusalem) (I), in part (most strong "Caesarean" witnesses are found in Soden's Iα group, with family 1 being his Iη and family 13 being Iι).

Kirsopp Lake, an outstanding British textual critic, developed the hypothesis of the relationship between ƒ1, ƒ13, Θ, 565, 700, and 28. Streeter carried Lake's work another step forward by pointing to Caesarea as the original location of the family.

F. G. Kenyon — Gamma (γ)

M. J. Lagrange — C

Witnesses 

 Other manuscripts
Uncial 0188,
174, 230, 406 (?),  788, 826, 828, 872 (only in Mark), 1071, 1275, 1424 (only in Mark), 1604, 2437, ℓ 32.

Textual features 
(Apparent Caesarean witnesses in Bold)

 It has additional text:  (and when the centurion returned to the house in that hour, he found the slave well) as well as codices , C, (N), Θ, (0250), ƒ1, (33., 1241.), g1, syrh.

  – Θ ƒ1 ƒ13 33.
  — majority of mss

  (and be baptized with the baptism that I am baptized with) [Matching MT and TR]
 omitted —  B D L Z Θ 085 ƒ1 ƒ13 it syrs, c sa

  — Θ ƒ1 700.* syrs, pal arm geo
  — majority of mss

  —  Θ ƒ1 565. 700 k sa
 omit — all other mss

  —  W Θ ƒ1 ƒ13 28. 565. 1365. iti itk copsa arm geo
  — majority of mss

  — Θ 28. 565. 700. pc syrh

  —  A C D L W Θ Ψ ƒ1 ƒ13 Byz [Matching MT and TR]
  —  B 0274 k

  —  A B2 C D X Θ 565. 892. 1009. 1071. 1195. 1216. 1230. 1241 1253. 1344. 1365. 1646. 2174. Byz Lect
 omitted — B* K W Δ Ψ ƒ1 ƒ13 28 700 1010. 1079. 1242. 1546. 2148. ℓ 10 ℓ 950 ℓ 1642 ℓ 1761 syrs arm geo

  — W Θ ƒ13 565 itaur itc
  —  Β C Δ Ψ 33. 1424.

  — Θ 565. 700. c
  — N ƒ13 28.
  —  Β C L W' Ψ 33. 892.
  — D
  — A Byz

  — W Θ ƒ13 28 61. 115. 255. 299. 565. 700. 1071. b c g2 l vgmss sa bo geob arm arabms Cyp
  — Byz

See also 
Other text-types
 Alexandrian text-type
 Western text-type
 Byzantine text-type
Subgroups of the Caesarean text-type
 Family 1
 Family 13

References

Sources 

 Burnett Hillman Streeter, The Four Gospels. A study of origins the manuscript traditions, sources, authorship, & dates, Oxford 1924, pp. 77-107.
 Bruce M. Metzger, The Caesarean Text of the Gospels, JBL, Vol. 64, No. 4 (Dec., 1945), pp. 457-489.
 Bruce M. Metzger and Bart D. Ehrman, The Text of the New Testament: Its Transmission, Corruption, and Restoration (4th edition, 2005), Oxford University Press, p. 310–312.
 Hurtado L. W., Text-Critical Methodology and the Pre-Caesarean Text: Codex W in the Gospel of Mark, S & D XLIII (Grand Rapids 1981).

External links 

 Text Types And Textual Kinship – from the Encyclopedia of Textual Criticism
 Concerning the "Caesarean Text"
 Origins of the Caesarean text

Bible versions and translations
New Testament text-types
Christian terminology